The Dunnan–Hampton House is an historic building in Paxton, Illinois, United States. It was built in 1897 and purchased by the Dunnan family in 1900. Distinctive features include the cupola, stained glass window, and hand-carved ornate woodwork. It was added to the National Register of Historic Places on May 22, 2007.

Reflective of the Queen Anne style, the house also incorporates elements of Stick Style and Eastlake Style. The house was restored by Ronald and Charlotte Hampton to the point where it is "almost exactly what it was like in 1897”.

References

External links
Flickr photo of the Dunnan–Hampton House

Houses in Ford County, Illinois
Queen Anne architecture in Illinois
Houses completed in 1897
National Register of Historic Places in Ford County, Illinois
Houses on the National Register of Historic Places in Illinois